Jettchen Gebert's Story (German:Jettchen Geberts Geschichte) is a 1918 German silent film directed by Richard Oswald and starring Mechthildis Thein, Conrad Veidt and Leo Connard. It is a lost film.

Cast
 Mechthildis Thein as Jettchen Gebert  
 Conrad Veidt as Doktor Friedrich Köstling  
 Leo Connard as Salomon Gebert  
 Martin Kettner as Ferdinand Gebert  
 Julius Spielmann as Jason Gebert  
 Clementine Plessner as Rikchen, Salomons Frau  
 Else Bäck as Hannchen, Ferdinands Frau  
 Max Gülstorff as Onkel Eli  
 Helene Rietz as Tante Minchen  
 Robert Koppel as Julius Jakoby aus Bentschen  
 Ilka Karen as Pinchen, Julius Schwester  
 Hugo Döblin as Onkel Naphtali  
 Fritz Richard

References

Bibliography
 John T. Soister. Conrad Veidt on Screen: A Comprehensive Illustrated Filmography. McFarland, 2002.

External links

1918 films
Films of the German Empire 
Films of the Weimar Republic
Films directed by Richard Oswald
German silent feature films
Films about Jews and Judaism
Films set in the 19th century
German black-and-white films
1910s German films